The Tree of Liberty, published weekly from 1800 to about 1810, was the second newspaper in Pittsburgh, Pennsylvania, United States.  John D. Israel established the paper and issued it from a building owned by Hugh Henry Brackenridge. Israel's columns promoted the Democratic-Republican politics of Thomas Jefferson while denouncing Federalists and their local organ, the Pittsburgh Gazette.

With the issue of 24 December 1805, Walter Forward assumed control of the paper with the participation of his friends Henry Baldwin and Tarleton Bates. In that time of disunity among Pennsylvania's Democratic-Republicans, the Tree sided with the moderate wing of the party supporting Governor Thomas McKean and clashed with the Commonwealth, a mouthpiece for the party's radical anti-McKean faction. Abuse from the Commonwealth led to Bates assaulting that paper's editor with a whip, and finally to the death of Bates in a duel.  The Tree changed hands from Forward to William Foster in April 1807, after which it remained in publication for approximately three years.

References

Bibliography

Defunct newspapers published in Pittsburgh
Defunct weekly newspapers
Publications established in 1800
1800 establishments in Pennsylvania